Meşəbaş (also, Meshabash) is a village and municipality in the Qakh Rayon of Azerbaijan.  It has a population of 382. It was historically the Georgian village Tkistavi. The great majority of the population are ethnic Georgians.

References 

Populated places in Qakh District